György "G. G." Golomán (born April 2, 1996) is a Hungarian professional basketball player for Lietkabelis Panevėžys of the Lithuanian Basketball League and the EuroCup. He played college basketball for the UCLA Bruins. Golomán went undrafted in the 2018 NBA draft. He started his career with Egis Körmend.

High school career
Golomán went to high school in Körmend, Hungary, for 3 years, and was part of the Hungarian men's national under-19 basketball team, when an American high school scout noticed him. He went overseas to Florida for his final high school season, playing for Sagemont School. He was recruited to UCLA after assistant Ed Schilling came to watch his teammate Prince Ali.

College career
Golomán played in 35 games in his freshman season at the University of California, Los Angeles (UCLA), averaging 1.3 points per game in 10.8 minutes of play. During his sophomore season, he played in 15 games, averaging 2.0 points per game in 12.1 minutes of play, before an injury ended his season. In his junior season, he made his first start, starting 5 games out of the 35 UCLA played that season. He averaged 3.7 points per game in 11.5 minutes. With the departure of T. J. Leaf in the 2017 NBA Draft, Golomán became the starting power forward for the Bruins in 2017–18. He started 30 games out of 33, and averaged 7.1 points, and 4.2 rebounds per game in 24.4 minutes of play.

Professional career
After going undrafted in the 2018 NBA Draft, Golomán was signed by the Los Angeles Lakers for the summer league, but didn't make the final roster, and was released on the 10th of October. The Westchester Knicks picked him up to their training camp roster, and he ended up making the final roster for the Knicks’ G League Team. He signed with the Yokohama B-Corsairs of the B.League in Japan for 2019–20.

On July 9, 2020, he has signed with Spirou Basket of the Pro Basketball League.

References

External links
UCLA Bruins bio

1996 births
Living people
BC Körmend players
Centers (basketball)
Hungarian men's basketball players
Hungarian expatriate sportspeople in the United States
Passlab Yamagata Wyverns players
People from Körmend
Spirou Charleroi players
UCLA Bruins men's basketball players
Westchester Knicks players
Yokohama B-Corsairs players
Sportspeople from Vas County